Titanoholtite is an extremely rare mineral with the formula (Ti0.75[]0.25)Al6BSi3O18. It is titanium-rich member of dumortierite supergroup, and titanium-analogue of holtite of the holtite group. It is one of three quite recently found minerals of this group, the other two being nioboholtite and szklaryite, all coming from the Szklary village near Ząbkowice Śląskie in Poland. They occur in a unique pegmatite of probable anatectic origin.

Association 
Titanoholtite is closely associated with holtite and nioboholtite; its further association is very rich (see szklaryite).

Notes on chemistry 
Impurities in titanoholtite are mainly antimony and arsenic, with trace niobium, tantalum, titanium, and iron.

References 

Silicate minerals
Titanium minerals
Aluminium minerals
Borate minerals
Orthorhombic minerals
Minerals in space group 57
Borosilicates